Surani is a commune in Prahova County, Muntenia, Romania. It is composed of two villages, Păcuri and Surani.

References

Surani
Localities in Muntenia